Chaenophryne longiceps, commonly known as the can-opener smoothdream, longhead dreamer or smooth-head dreamer, is a species of anglerfish in the family Oneirodidae (dreamers).

Description

Chaenophryne longiceps is known for its monstrous appearance: inky black in colour with sharp pointed teeth (28–40 in upper jaw, 34–57 in lower) and (in females) a pointed lure (esca) protruding from its forehead. It has 6–8 dorsal soft rays and 5–6 anal soft rays. Its specific name, longiceps, means "long head."

Habitat

In 2010 it was found off Greenland for the first time.

Behaviour

Feeds on fish, cephalopods and crustaceans.

References

Oneirodidae
Fish described in 1867